Chąśno  is a village in Łowicz County, Łódź Voivodeship, in central Poland. It is the seat of the gmina (administrative district) called Gmina Chąśno.

References

Villages in Łowicz County
Łódź Voivodeship (1919–1939)